Unity Tower, formerly known as the  Skeletor is a 102.5 metre high-rise building located in Kraków, Poland. Unity Tower is located near the Mogilskie Roundabout (Rondo Mogilskie) and Cracow University of Economics. It is the tallest building in Kraków. The construction work of Unity Centre was completed on 30 September 2020.

History 

Originally, it was intended to become the regional office of the Main Technical Organization (Naczelna Organizacja Techniczna, NOT) and be named the NOT Tower. The construction of the building was started in 1975, but stopped permanently in 1979 because of economic constraints and political unrest which later led to the imposition of martial law in Poland in 1981.

Due to the skeletal appearance of the unfinished building, it was dubbed the Skeletor.

Investors expressed interest in renovating the building in the past, but they were discouraged by the complicated legal status of the land on which it stood and the high cost of its demolition or adaptation. In 2007, a new plan for the building was put forward, which postulated to increase its height from 92 to as high as 130 meters. German architect Hans Kollhoff was invited to take part in the reconstruction of the building, which was supposed to be completed by the time of UEFA Euro 2012 in Poland and Ukraine. However, the project was rejected by the Provincial Conservation Council on the grounds that the new building was located within a historical urban landscape.

The building was partially owned by TreiMorfa Project. The long debate about its possible future use based on brand new plans was cut short by the courts in December 2011 because of legal improprieties by its new design team.

Austrian engineering company Strabag was given the commission to rebuild. The building's floors were removed and replaced, but the steel frame retained and reused. The exterior architecture was inspired by the Art Deco architecture of the 1920s and 30s. The use of grey stone and the architecture was partially inspired by the Maccabees Building.

In 2018, before the full reconstruction of the building was completed, the ArchDaily architecture website named Szkieletor as one of "History's Most Notorious Unfinished Buildings" alongside the Palace of the Soviets, Siena Cathedral and Ryugyong Hotel.

Gallery

See also
List of tallest buildings in Poland
List of tallest buildings in Warsaw
List of tallest buildings in Katowice

References

External links 

Buildings and structures in Kraków
Office buildings completed in 2020
Skyscrapers in Poland
Rebuilt buildings and structures in Poland